Oumar N'Diaye (born 22 July 1985) is a former professional footballer who played as a centre-back. Born in France, he made 21 appearances for the Mauritania national team at international level, scoring 1 goal.

Career statistics
Scores and results list Mauritania's goal tally first.

Honours
Vannes
 Coupe de la Ligue: runner-up 2008–09

References

External links
 
 

1985 births
Living people
People from Mantes-la-Jolie
Footballers from Yvelines
Association football central defenders
Mauritanian footballers
Mauritania international footballers
French footballers
French sportspeople of Mauritanian descent
French sportspeople of Senegalese descent
Stade Malherbe Caen players
Ligue 1 players
Ligue 2 players
Vannes OC players
FC Mantois 78 players